Gustavo Gutiérrez Merino  (born 8 June 1928) is a Peruvian philosopher, Catholic theologian, and Dominican priest, regarded as one of the founders of Latin American liberation theology. He currently holds the John Cardinal O'Hara Professorship of Theology at the University of Notre Dame, and has previously been a visiting professor at many major universities in North America and Europe.

He studied medicine and literature at the National University of San Marcos, where he also became involved with Catholic Action, which greatly influenced his theological arguments. At the Theology Faculty of Leuven in Belgium and Lyon, France, he began studying theology. He has taught at the University of Michigan, Harvard, Cambridge, Berkeley, and Montréal, among other schools.

His theological focus aims to connect salvation and liberation through the preferential option for the poor, or the emphasis on improving the material conditions of the impoverished. Gutierrez proposes that revelation and eschatology have been excessively idealized at the expense of efforts to bring about the Kingdom of God on Earth. In this way, his methodology is often critical of the social and economic injustice he believes to be responsible for poverty in Latin America and the clergy within the Catholic Church. The central pastoral question of his work is: "How do we convey to the poor that God loves them?”

In 1974, Gutiérrez founded the Lima branch of the Bartolomé de Las Casas Institute. The Institute, in its mission statement, aims to use theology as a means of addressing contemporary social issues and educating through research, engagement with lawmakers, and collaboration with grassroots organizations.

Gutiérrez is a member of the Peruvian Academy of Language. In 1993, he was awarded the Legion of Honor by the French government for his tireless work. In 2002 Gutiérrez was elected to the American Academy of Arts and Sciences and in 2003 he received the Príncipe de Asturias award. In 2016, he received the Pacem in Terris Award from St. Ambrose University.

Early life and education 
On 8 June 1928, Gustavo Gutierrez was born to mestizo parentage, being half-Hispanic and half-Indigenous.

Gutiérrez was afflicted with osteomyelitis as an adolescent and was frequently bed-ridden. He had to use a wheelchair from age 12 to 18. However, he describes this time as a formative experience, claiming it instilled the value of hope through prayer and the love of family in friends. As he describes it, this experience had a profound impact on his interest in theology.

He initially studied medicine at the National University of San Marcos in Peru in order to become a psychiatrist, then he realized he wanted to become a priest. He completed his theological studies in the Theology Faculty of Leuven in Belgium and in Lyon in France, where he studied under Henri de Lubac, Yves Congar, Marie Dominique Chenu, Christian Ducoq, and several others. It was also here where Gutiérrez was introduced to the Dominican and Jesuit ideologies, and was influenced by the work of Edward Schillebeeckx, Karl Rahner, Hans Küng, and Johann Baptist Metz. His time in Europe influenced Gutiérrez to discuss the openness of the Church to the contemporary world. He was also influenced by Protestant theologians such as Karl Barth and social scientists such as François Perroux and his idea of development. In 1959, Gutiérrez was ordained a priest.

While studying in Europe, Gutiérrez was exposed to other, non-religious thinkers who had a profound impact on his ideology and the eventual formation of Latin American liberation theology. At the Faculty of Theology in Lyons, France he studied Karl Marx, Sigmund Freud - who he did a philosophy licentiate on at the University of Louvrain - and evolutionary theorists traditionally opposed or discouraged by the church. Marx's discussion of class struggle and the material conditions of poverty provided Gutiérrez a framework for understanding socio-economic inequality.

Gutiérrez was at one time a parish priest of the Iglesia Cristo Redentor (Church of the Holy Redeemer) in Rimac, Peru.

Foundations of liberation theology 
When he returned to Peru, Gutiérrez began to formulate his understanding of Latin American "reality" – the foundation and driving force of Latin American liberation theology. He states: "I come from a continent in which more than 60% of the population lives in a state of poverty, and 82% of those find themselves in extreme poverty." Gutiérrez focused his efforts on the rediscovery of love thy neighbor as the central axiom of Christian life. He felt the European theology he had studied did not reflect the oppressive material conditions in Latin America. In 2003, Gutiérrez reminisced that his "parishioners in Lima would...  teach me volumes about hope in the midst of suffering". This relationship with Christianity would inspire his book On Job, published in 1987.

An outline of Gutiérrez's theological proposal was drafted in his conference "Towards a Theology of Liberation" during the Second Meeting of Priests and Laity in Chimbote, Peru, between 21 and 25 July 1968. In this proposal, he cites on multiple occasions Vatican II's Gaudium et Spes and Paul VI's Populorum Progressio. To Gutiérrez, the source of the problems of Latin America was the sin manifested in an unjust social structure. His solution to this problem was to emphasize the dignity of the poor by prioritizing the glory of God present in them. This perspective would be refined over the next five years, until Gutiérrez published A Theology of Liberation in 1973.

Latin American liberation theology thus emerged as a biblical analysis of poverty. Gutiérrez distinguished two forms of poverty: a "scandalous state" and a "spiritual childhood." He noted that, while the former is abhorred by God, the second is valued. Gutiérrez identified that each form of poverty was present in Latin America, wherein one hungers for bread and for God. It is only through the manifestation of a committed faith that the purposes of God can be manifested to man, regardless of the color or social class under which he was born. Liberation theology insists on prioritizing the gift of life as the supreme manifestation of God.

Gutiérrez asserts that his understanding of poverty as a "scandalous state" is reflected in Luke's beatitude "Blessed are you poor, for the kingdom of God is yours", whereas his interpretation of it as "spiritual childhood" has precedent in Matthew's verse, "Blessed are the poor in spirit, for theirs is the kingdom of Heaven". He argues that there are forms of poverty beyond economic.

Writings on the option for the poor 
Gutiérrez calls for understanding the reality of the poor. Being poor is not simply lacking the economic resources for development. On the contrary, Gutiérrez understands poverty as "a way of living, of thinking, of loving, of praying, of believing and waiting, of spending free time, of fighting for life." On the other hand, the Dominican emphasizes that poverty is the result of flawed social institutions. While many theologians oversimplify poverty's social roots, for Gutiérrez the origin of poverty is much more complex. In Latin America, it originates from the times of the conquest and to that is added several political, geographical, and personal factors.

The proclamation of the gospel in the midst of the unjust situation in Latin America leads to a praxis based on principles derived from the word of God. In the article Theology and Poverty, Gutiérrez recalls that this option should lead to three well-defined actions, with the preferential option for the poor unfolding as a fundamental axis of the Christian life on three levels:
 The announcement and testimony of the reign of God denounces poverty.
 The intelligence of faith reveals essential aspects of God and provides a perspective for theological work.
 Walking in the footsteps of Jesus, otherwise known as spirituality, is, on the deepest level, the basis on which everything else rests.

The main biblical foundation for this praxis lies in the kenotic incarnation of Christ. To Gutiérrez, the ministry of Christ among the rejected and despised of his time is a clear example for the contemporary Church. Furthermore, "the incarnation is an act of love. Christ becomes man, dies and rises to liberate us, and makes us enjoy freedom. To die and be resurrected with Christ is to overcome death and enter into a new life. The cross and the resurrection seal our freedom." The freedom of Christ is seen by Gutiérrez as the source of spiritual and economic freedom.

Theological reflection on liberation is not just a simple discourse without practical and concrete implications. Reflection on the situation of the poor leads to what liberation theologians call "liberating praxis", where they attempt to rectify the process by which the faith of the Church builds the economic, spiritual and intellectual liberation of socially oppressed peoples as fulfillment of the kingdom of God. The liberating praxis, then, has its basis in the love that God manifests for us and in the sense of solidarity and fellowship that should exist in interpersonal relationships among the children of God.  These are concepts that Gutiérrez developed in concert with education activist/philosopher Paulo Freire, whose 1971 seminal work Pedagogy of the Oppressed explored the concept of praxis and a preferential option for the poor.

Legacy 

Gutiérrez is an influential figure within 20th century theology as a whole, and responses to his work have been polarized. Arthur McGovern identifies liberation theology as an anomaly within theologian fields, arguing that theology discourse is generally limited to academic circles. He argues that Gutiérrez's theories, however, have considerable and tangible impacts on the Latin America's socio-economic conditions.

Liberation theology was intended as a call to all believers in Latin America to act on the biblical commitment to the poor. Gutiérrez's message on material and economic conditions serves to place inequality in both religious and political discourse. Gutiérrez's thought has influenced theology, both in Latin America and abroad. This influence can be observed from the evangelical proposal of the "integral mission" developed years after the origin of liberation, to the development of social ministries within the evangelical churches in the last decades.

Among his most prominent followers are Hugo Echegaray and Luis Felipe Zegarra Russo. His friends include the German theologian Gerhard Ludwig Müller, the former Prefect of the Congregation for the Doctrine of the Faith. On the subject of Gustavo Gutiérrez's thought, of which he was a student, Müller stated: "The theology of Gustavo Gutiérrez, how it is considered, is orthodox because it is orthopractic and teaches us the correct Christian way of acting, since it derives from authentic faith." On Gutiérrez's 90th birthday, in 2018, Pope Francis thanked him for his contributions "to the church and humanity through your theological service and your preferential love for the poor and discarded of society." While Gutiérrez's positions were never censored by the Church, he had been asked to modify some of his propositions.

Criticisms 

In the early 1970s, Gutiérrez gave a controversial lecture in Córdoba, Argentina upon being invited by the Movement of Priests for the Third World. He refused to speak unless Father Jerónimo Podestá - a fellow liberation theologian who, unlike Gutiérrez, fought for the right of priests to marry - left the room. Years after, Podestá's widow and fellow critic of mandatory celibacy within the church, Clelia Luro deemed Guiterrez's attitude towards the issue to be discriminatory, criticizing him in the following letter:

In 1984, the Holy See - under Pope John Paul II - criticised aspects of liberation theology, taking particular issue with its use of Marxist economic theory. Then-Cardinal Joseph Ratzinger asked Peruvian bishops to examine Guiterrez's writings, voicing concerns that Gutierrez's arguments embodied a concerning "idealization of faith". As a result, he and liberation theology were the subjects of 36-page Vatican report, which declared Marxism to be incompatible with Catholic teachings. The Catholic Church in Peru then held a vote to rebuke Gutiérrez's ordination within the group, which ended in a tie.

According to Arthur McGovern, controversy regarding Gutiérrez and liberation theology was not limited to the Catholic Church: the New York Times and the Wall Street Journal printed full-scale advertisements warning readers of a potential communist state in Mexico, arguing that "liberation theology… [would] install Communism in the name of Christianity" and encourage acts of terrorism.

Selected works
 On the Side of the Poor: The Theology of Liberation. Co-authored with Cardinal Gerhard Ludwig Müller. Orbis Books, 2015: 
 In the Company of the Poor: conversations between Dr. Paul Farmer and Fr. Gustavo Gutiérrez. Ed. Michael Griffin and Jennie Weiss Block. Orbis Books, 2013: 
 Las Casas: In Search of the Poor of Jesus Christ, trans. Robert R. Barr (Maryknoll: Orbis, 1993). Originally published as En busca de los pobres de Jesucristo: El pensamiento de Bartolomé de las Casas (Lima: CEP, 1992).
 The God of Life, trans. Matthew J. O'Connell (Maryknoll: Orbis, 1991). Originally published as El Dios de la vida (Lima: CEP, 1989).
 On Job: God-Talk and the Suffering of the Innocent, trans. Matthew J. O'Connell (Maryknoll: Orbis, 1987). Originally published as Hablar de Dios desde el sufrimiento del inocente (Lima: CEP, 1986).
 The Truth Shall Make You Free: Confrontations, trans. Matthew J. O'Connell (Maryknoll: Orbis, 1990). Originally published as La verdad los hará libres: Confrontaciones (Lima: CEP, 1986).
 We Drink from Our Own Wells: The Spiritual Journey of a People, 20th anniversary ed., trans. Matthew J. O'Connell (Maryknoll: Orbis, 2003; 1st ed., Maryknoll: Orbis, 1984). Originally published as Beber en su propio pozo: En el itinerario espiritual de un pueblo (Lima: CEP, 1983).
 A Theology of Liberation: History, Politics, and Salvation, 15th anniversary ed., trans. Caridad Inda and John Eagleson (Maryknoll: Orbis, 1988; 1st ed., Maryknoll: Orbis, 1973). Originally published as Teología de la liberación: Perspectivas (Lima: CEP, 1971).

See also

Liberation theology
Black theology
Christian communism
Christian left
Christian socialism
Progressive Christianity
Social gospel
Social justice

References

Further reading

External links

 Gustavo Gutiérrez on the University of Notre Dame website
 Audio downloads of Gutiérrez's 1995 Drummond Lectures in Scotland
 Sacred Congregation for the Doctrine of the Faith-August 6, 1984. Instruction on certain aspect of  "Liberation Theology"
 Liberation Theology in the World History Encyclopedia

1928 births
Living people
People from Lima
Anti-poverty advocates
Peruvian Dominicans
Peruvian Christian theologians
Peruvian Christian socialists
Peruvian philosophers
Catholic philosophers
Liberation theologians
Christian Peace Conference members
Peruvian people of Quechua descent
University of Notre Dame faculty
Catholic University of Leuven (1834–1968) alumni
National University of San Marcos alumni
Christian radicals
Catholic socialists
Christian socialist theologians
World Christianity scholars
Catholicism and far-left politics